The coal tit or cole tit, (Periparus ater), is a small passerine bird in the tit family, Paridae. It is a widespread and common resident breeder in forests throughout the temperate to subtropical Palearctic, including North Africa. The black-crested tit is now usually included in this species.

Taxonomy and systematics
This species was first described by Carl Linnaeus in his landmark 1758 10th edition of Systema Naturae. Linnaeus' primary reference was his earlier Fauna Svecica, whose cumbersome pre-binomial name Parus capite nigro: vertice albo, dorso cinereo, pectore albo ("black-headed tit with white nape, ash-grey back, white breast") became the much simpler yet no less unequivocal Parus ater. This name – meaning "dusky-black tit" – was simply adopted from older ornithological textbooks, ultimately going back to Conrad Gessner's 1555 Historia animalium. He gave no type locality except "Europe", but his original description refers to the population inhabiting Sweden (which is consequently included in the nominate subspecies today). The current genus name, is Ancient Greek peri plus the pre-existing genus Parus. The specific ater is Latin for "dull black".

Gessner also notes that the coal tit was known as Kohlmeiß in German – the literal equivalent of its English name, though in its modern orthography Kohlmeise it refers to the great tit (Parus major). That bird was in Gessner's day usually called Spiegelmeiß ("multicoloured tit"), Brandtmeiß ("burnt tit") or grosse Meiß ("great tit") in German. Kölmeyß was attested for P. major by William Turner, but Turner does not list P. ater at all, while Gessner notes that his hunters always used Kohlmeiß for the present species. However, this has since changed, and the modern German name of P. ater is Tannenmeise ("fir tit"), after a typical habitat. This name is attested (as Tannen-Maise) by Johann Leonhard Frisch in the early 18th century already, who furthermore records that P. ater was also called Kleine Kohl-Maise ("small coal tit") whereas Kohl-Maise referred unequivocally to P. major. Frisch collected his data in the Berlin region, where the German dialect was quite different from that spoken by Gessner's Alemannic sources 200 years earlier, and heavily influenced by Middle Low German – the language of the northern German sources of Turner. Regarding that, Tanne is derived from the Old Saxon danna, and thus had spread through the German dialect continuum from north to south. 

In addition, the same data suggest that this species is paraphyletic in regard to the closely related and parapatric spot-winged tit (P. melanolophus) from South Asia, which looks like a slightly crested, darker version of P. ater. Consequently, the spot-winged tit might have to be included in P. ater, or some coal tits could be considered a distinct species. As occasional hybridization has been recorded between the two, mtDNA alone (which is inherited only from the mother) is insufficient to determine whether hybrid gene flow or another trivial cause (such as incomplete lineage sorting) obfuscates the actual relationships, or whether taxonomic rearrangement is indeed required. With the range of these titmice encircling the Himalayas, without further study it cannot even be excluded that they constitute a ring species – with gene flow occurring in Nepal but not in Afghanistan – as has been shown for other passerines in the same region.

Subspecies

A number of coal tit subspecies are distinguished. The differences in colouration are quite pronounced in some of them, while their differences in size are more subtle. Coal tits from Asia follow Bergmann's rule, being larger in colder regions; those from further west, however, do not, as the birds from the uplands around the Mediterranean are larger than those from northern Europe. Across its range, tail length in relation to body length increases along a cline running from southwest to northeast.

The British race P. a. britannicus has an olive hue to its brownish-grey back plumage, distinguishing it from the continental European nominate subspecies P. a. ater and P. a. abietum in which the back is bluish grey without a hint of green or brown. The Irish race P. a. hibernicus is distinguished from britannicus by the pale sulphur-yellow cheeks, breast and belly. It also has a paler rump (due to light fringes of the uppertail coverts) and a larger bill than its relatives from Britain and the Continent.

The North African race P. a. ledouci has yellow underparts and cheeks, and the Cypriot P. a. cypriotes has a buff tinge to its upper parts, and deep buff underparts. Asian subspecies are generally rather dusky brownish except for the black-and-white head; they include among others P. a. michalowskii of the Caucasus, P. a. phaeonotus of Iran, or the Himalayan coal tit P. a. aemodius of southwestern China.

Description
 
The coal tit is 10–11.5 cm in length, and has a distinctive large white nape spot on its black head. The head, throat and neck of the adult are glossy blue-black, setting off the off-white sides of the face (tinged grey to yellow depending on subspecies) and the brilliant white nape; the white tips of the wing coverts appear as two wingbars. The underparts are whitish shading through buff to rufous on the flanks. The bill is black, the legs lead-coloured, and irides dark brown.

The young birds are duller than the adults, lacking gloss on the black head, and with the white of nape and cheeks tinged with yellow.

While searching for food, coal tit flocks keep contact with incessant short dee or see-see calls. The species' song – if "song" it can be called – is a strident if-he, if-he, if-he, heard most frequently from January to June, but also in autumn. The song resembles that of the great tit, but much faster and higher in pitch. One variant of this song ends with a sharp ichi. North African birds also have a  call similar to that of the crested tit (Lophophanes cristatus) which is not found in Africa.

Behaviour and ecology

It is typically a bird of temperate humid conifer forest, but apart from that shows little habitat specificity. In Bhutan for example coal tits are fairly common residents above the subtropical zone, at about 3,000–3,800 m ASL, and are found in forests dominated by Bhutan fir (Abies densa) as well as in those characterized by Himalayan hemlock (Tsuga dumosa) and rhododendrons.

The coal tit is an all-year resident throughout almost all range, making only local movements in response to particularly severe weather; only the Siberian birds have a more regular migration. Very rarely, vagrants may cross longer distances; for example the nominate subspecies of continental Europe was recorded in Ireland once in 1960 and once before that, but apparently not since then.

Coal tits will form small flocks in winter with other tits. This species resembles other tits in acrobatic skill and restless activity, though it more frequently pitches on a trunk, and in little hops resembles a treecreeper (Certhia). Its food is similar to that of the others; it is keen on beechmast, picks out the seeds from fir (Abies) and larch (Larix) cones, and joins Carduelis redpolls and siskins in alders (Alnus) and birches (Betula). It will also visit gardens to feed on a variety of foods put out, particularly sunflower seeds.

Coal tits in the laboratory prefer to forage at a variable feeding site when they are in a negative energy budget. They increase evening body mass in response to tawny owl calls. 
After dawn the coal tits increases body mass as soon as possible if food is obtained at a low rate, increasing body mass exponentially until an inflection point when the increase of body mass is slower. The inflection point of the body mass trajectory is 16.7% delayed compared to a high food availability. Subordinate coal tits are excluded from feeding sites by dominants more often in the early morning than in the rest of the day, and they showed more variability in daily mass gain and body mass at dawn than dominant coal tits. In winter, the red blood cells of coal tits has been shown to contain more mitochondria, which consume oxygen and produce heat.

Being common and widespread, the coal tit is not considered a threatened species by the IUCN.

The coal tit has the dubious distinction of having the largest number of bird fleas (Ceratophyllus gallinae) reported from a single nest, 5,754 fleas.

Breeding 
A favourite nesting site is a hole in a rotting tree-stump, often low down, and the nest is deep within the hole; holes in the ground, burrows of mice or rabbits, chinks between the stones in walls, old nests of Pica magpies or other large birds, and squirrel dreys are also occupied. The materials, moss, hair and grass, are closely felted together, and rabbit fur or feathers added for lining. Seven to eleven red-spotted white eggs are laid, usually in May; this species breeds usually once per year.

See also
 Common treecreeper and Hodgson's treecreeper
 Greenish warbler

Footnotes

References
 Bangs, Outram (1932): Birds of western China obtained by the Kelley-Roosevelts expedition. Field Mus. Nat. Hist. Zool. Ser. 18 (11): 343–379. Fulltext at the Internet Archive
 
 
 BirdsIreland.com (BI) [2009]: Irish subspecies – Coal Tit. Retrieved 17 May 2009.
 
 Frisch, Johann Leonhard (1720): Der II.ten Hauptart I.te Abtheilung von den Maisen – I.te Platte ["First division of the second primary species, the titmice – Plate 1"]. In: Vorstellung der Vögel in Teutschland, und beyläuffig auch einiger fremden, mit ihren natürlichen Farben, etc. (vol. 2): plate 13 [German with Latin and French captions]. F.H.Frisch, Berlin ("Berolinum"). Digitized version
 Gessner, Conrad (1555): Historiae animalium (vol. 3) [Latin book]. Christoph Froschauer, Zürich ("Tigurium"). Digitized version
 Gill, Frank B.; Slikas, Beth & Sheldon, Frederick H. (2005): Phylogeny of titmice (Paridae): II. Species relationships based on sequences of the mitochondrial cytochrome-b gene. Auk 122: 121–143. DOI: 10.1642/0004-8038(2005)122[0121:POTPIS]2.0.CO;2 HTML abstract
 Inskipp, Carol; Inskipp, Tim & Sherub (2000): The ornithological importance of Thrumshingla National Park, Bhutan. Forktail 14: 147–162. PDF fulltext
 Linnaeus, Carl (1746): 241. Parus capite nigro: vertice albo, dorso cinereo, pectore albo. In: Fauna Svecica Sistens Animalia Sveciæ Regni, etc. (1st ed.): 89 [Latin book]. Conrad & Georg Jacob Wishoff, Leiden ("Lugdunum Batavorum"). Digitized version
 Linnaeus, Carl (1758): 100.5. Parus ater. In: Systema naturae per regna tria naturae, secundum classes, ordines, genera, species, cum characteribus, differentiis, synonymis, locis (10th ed., vol. 1): 190 [Latin book]. Lars Salvius, Stockholm ("Holmius"). Digitized version
 
 
 Snow, D.W. (1954): Trends in geographical variation in Palearctic members of the genus Parus. Evolution 8 (1): 19–28. First page image
 Turner, William (1544a): De paris ["Of the titmice"]. In: Avium praecipuarum, quarum apud Plinium et Aristotelem mentio est, brevis et succincta historia, etc.: 94–95 [Latin book]. Johann Gymnich, Cologne ("Colonia"). Digitized version
 Turner, William (1544b): [List of German bird names]. In: van Langerack, Gijsbert: Dialogus de avibus, et earum nominibus Graecis, Latinis, et Germanicis, etc.: 95–97 [Latin book]. Johann Gymnich, Cologne ("Colonia"). Digitized version

External links

 BBC Radio: Coal tit song. Retrieved 21 November 2006.
 RSPB: Coal tit. Includes song and video. Retrieved 13 March 2008.
 Ageing and sexing (PDF; 2.8 MB) by Javier Blasco-Zumeta & Gerd-Michael Heinze
 Feathers of coal tit (Parus ater) 
 Avibase.  Retrieved 23 October 2020.

Articles containing video clips
Birds described in 1758
Taxa named by Carl Linnaeus
Birds of Eurasia
Periparus